Insight-oriented psychotherapy is a category of psychotherapies that rely on conversation between the therapist and the client (or patient). It involves developing the patient's understanding of past and present experiences, how they are related to each other and the effect they have on the patient's interpersonal relationships, emotions and symptoms. Insight-oriented psychotherapy can be an intensive process, wherein the client must spend multiple days per week with the therapist.

Overview
Forms of insight-oriented psychotherapy include psychoanalysis and Gestalt therapy. Insight oriented psychotherapy places a large emphasis on personal discovery for the patient. Through dedication to trust filled conversations, the patient will go through a process of enlightenment with the therapist. The patient will begin to understand significant life events of theirs as triggers or agents of change for how they live their lives today. Researchers have concluded that Insight has a clinically significant effect on the therapeutic outcomes of psychotherapy, to the point where it is now considered as relevant as long-standing factors like empathy, positive regard and therapeutic alliance.

History
The oldest form of insight-oriented psychotherapy was developed by Freud and is known as psychoanalysis.Freud avoided ordinary experimental methods and sought to establish the case history as a method of research. His first main collection of case histories was included in his book titled Studies on Hysteria. In this book, Freud and Breuer argued that regaining repressed memories associated with trauma would lead to resolution of dissociative amnesia and the associated psychological symptoms.

Psychedelic therapy

Some evidence suggests that the process of insight-oriented psychotherapy can be improved by the use of drugs, which can be described as psychedelic drugs (meaning "mind-manifesting"). Psychedelic substances, such as the amphetamine MDMA, can be used in psychotherapy to reinforce and enhance the relationship between the healthcare professional and his or her client (or patient). Such substances can be used to better manage abreaction and catharsis and improve the quality of understanding between the healthcare professional and patient.

Numerous clinical papers on the effectiveness of psychedelics in insight-oriented drug therapy have been published. These psychedelics were used to treat a wide variety of psychological issues, including "alcoholism, obsessional neurosis, and sociopathy". Furthermore, it was found that psychedelics were effective in easing the process of dying patients. A major reason for the clinical interest in psychedelic drugs for psychoanalysis was the belief of some experimental subjects that the experience of using psychedelic medication reduced their feelings of guilt and made them less depressed and anxious and more self-accepting, tolerant, and alert.

Role of therapist
The two main roles for the therapist are to stay neutral and abstinent towards their patients. Patients who are engaging with Insight-oriented psychotherapy attempt to build a trust-infused rapport with the therapist. It is believed that patients will be able to speak freely without feeling judgement if they understand that their therapist is not reacting, either positively or negatively towards what the patient is saying. In this way, the therapist is keeping a neutral disposition towards the patient.

Issues
The popular treatment methods used can also generate placebo insights within clients. Since patients may face a lot of pressure in the therapeutic encounter, they may experience "insights" such as illusions, deception, or adaptive self-misunderstandings—and it can also generate therapeutic artefacts that seem to confirm these insights.

Different treatment options based on other assumptions about certain ameliorative factors in psychotherapy have been affected by this trend towards shorter treatment procedures. Insight-oriented therapies have generally consisted of treatment approaches that share the premise that behavior is disturbed in some manner through a lack of client awareness.

Many problems have emerged in clinical treatment settings, in large part due to time limitations, as well as the restricted, minimal focus placed upon each of the above types of treatment.

Case study
In one example of insight-oriented psychotherapy, a nearly middle aged woman was having difficulty with her cancer treatment. The treatments themselves were not the issue. The issue was that this cancer patient was confusing her past, tumultuous relationships with her current ones—specifically with the doctors who were supposed to be treating her. "Associations to the follow-up pelvic exams and second-look surgery (which was negative) reminded her of her father's violation and denigration of women. She felt as though she was subjecting herself to yet another uncaring man who was out to hurt and humiliate a woman." It was ultimately these realizations that the patient came to in her insight-oriented sessions that allowed her to continue her cancer treatment.

References

Gestalt therapy
Psychotherapies